Erich Obermayer (born 23 January 1953, in Wien) is a former Austrian football player.

Club career
Obermayer came aged 16 from FC Wien and played 20 years for Austria Wien. He was chosen in Austria's Team of the Century in 2001.

International career
He made his debut for Austria in an April 1975 European Championship qualification match against Hungary and was a participant at the 1978 FIFA World Cup, where he scored a goal in a match against the Netherlands, and 1982 FIFA World Cup where he skippered the team. He earned 50 caps, scoring one goal. His last international was a March 1985 friendly match against the Soviet Union.

External links 
 Austria Wien archive

References 

1953 births
Living people
Footballers from Vienna
Austrian footballers
Austria international footballers
1978 FIFA World Cup players
1982 FIFA World Cup players
FK Austria Wien players
Austrian Football Bundesliga players
Association football defenders
Austrian football managers
Floridsdorfer AC managers